Graphopsocus is a genus of insects belonging to the family Stenopsocidae.

The species of this genus are found in Europe, Southeastern Asia and Northern America.

Species:
 Graphopsocus borealis Li & Fasheng, 2002
 Graphopsocus choui Li & Fasheng, 1992

References

Stenopsocidae
Psocoptera genera